Chronicle of a Homicide (also known as Italian Streetfighters) is a 1972 Italian crime-drama film directed by Mauro Bolognini.

Cast
Massimo Ranieri: Fabio Sola
Martin Balsam: Judge Aldo Sola
Valentina Cortese: Luisa Sola
Turi Ferro: Inspector Malacarne
Pino Colizzi: Inspector Alberto Cottone
Salvo Randone: Procuratore Generale
Luigi Diberti: Massimo Trotti 
Mariano Rigillo: Luca Binda
Massimo Sarchielli: Giuseppe 
Piero Gerlini: Marcello

References

External links

1972 films
1970s Italian-language films
Films directed by Mauro Bolognini
Italian crime drama films
Films scored by Ennio Morricone
1972 crime drama films
Films with screenplays by Ugo Pirro
1970s Italian films